USS Kennedy  may refer to:

Named for John Pendleton Kennedy (1795–1870)
 was a supply ship purchased by the US Navy in 1853 and sold in November 1855
 was a  launched 15 February 1919 and scrapped in 1931
Named for Joseph Patrick Kennedy, Jr. (1915–1944)
 was a  launched 26 July 1945, decommissioned in 1973 and preserved as a museum ship
Named for John Fitzgerald Kennedy (1917–1963)
, an aircraft carrier in commission from 1968 to 2007
, a  currently fitting out

United States Navy ship names